The Ereğli–Armutçuk railway is an abandoned railway in the Zonguldak Province of Turkey. The railway ran from a large coal mine in Armutçuk (present day Kandilli) to the port town of Karadeniz Ereğli and the large Erdemir steel mill. The primary function of the line was to bring coal from the mines to the steel mill, but passenger service also operated to small villages along the line.

The railway was originally constructed to be the northern terminus of the Irmak-Zonguldak railway, since Ereğli had a larger port than Zonguldak; however the cost of bridging the  gap between Armutçuk and Kozlu (the terminus of the Irmak-Zonguldak railway) proved to be too expensive, due to the mountainous terrain. Plans were postponed thereafter and due to the lack of government investment into the Turkish railways in the second half of the 20th century, the railways were never connected. Instead, the line operated as an isolated railway for about 40 years until it was abandoned in the 1990s.

References

Railway lines in Turkey
1953 establishments in Turkey
Railway lines opened in 1953
Transport in Zonguldak Province
Closed railway lines in Turkey